This is a compilation of the results of teams representing Sweden at official international women's football competitions such as the former UEFA Women's Cup and its successor, the UEFA Women's Champions League.

Sweden has been a powerhouse of the competition, especially in the UEFA Women's Cup era with two trophies for Umeå and four other appearances at the final by Umeå and Djurgården/Älvsjö in eight editions. In the UEFA Women's Champions League Tyresö has reached the final once too. Both the champion and the runner-up of the Damallsvenskan qualify for the competition as Sweden is ranked 3rd in the UEFA Women's Champions League association standings as of the 2016–17 edition with a coefficient of 61,500.

Teams
These are the eight teams that have representred Sweden in the UEFA Women's Cup and the UEFA Women's Champions League.

Historical progression

Results by team

Djurgården

Eskilstuna United

Göteborg

Linköping

Örebro

Rosengård

Tyresö

Umeå

References

Women